Herencia is a municipality located in the Province of Ciudad Real, in the autonomous community of Castilla-La Mancha, Spain. It has a population of 8,500. The postal code is 13640. It's located 150 km away from the south of Madrid.

Herencia is located on part of the eighth stretch of Don Quixote's route; a route which passes through different towns of Castilla-La Mancha. Two medium-sized hills are found behind the village on which windmills are placed.

Interesting monuments and places 

 The Church of La Inmaculada Concepción
 The Church of Our Lady of Mercy, which was a Mercedarian monastery in the past.
 The Windmills
 "La copa", a water tank created in 1946, located next to the natural reserve of "La Pedriza".
 "Los Caños", old fountains that supplied water to the town in the past.
 The Public Park, where we can find a great variety of natural vegetation of the area.
 The hermitages of San Cristóbal, San Bartolomé, San Antón, La Asunción (commonly called "La Labradora"), el Santo Cristo de la Misericordia, San José and La Encarnación.

Municipalities in the Province of Ciudad Real